The  is a Shintō shrine in the city of Fujinomiya in Shizuoka Prefecture, Japan. It is the ichinomiya of former Suruga Province, and is the head shrine of the approximately 1300 Asama or Sengen shrines in the country. The shrine has an extensive location within downtown Fujinomiya; in addition, the entire top of Mount Fuji from the 8th stage upwards is considered to be part of the shrine grounds. 

The main festival of the shrine is held annually on May 5, and features yabusame performances.

In 2013, the shrine was added to the World Heritage List as part of the Fujisan Cultural Site.

Enshrined kami

Secondary kami
 , husband of Konohanasakuya-hime
 , father of Konohanasakuya-hime

History
The foundation of the Fujisan Hongū Sengen Taisha predates the historical period. Per shrine tradition, it was established in the reign of Emperor Suinin, with the shrine first built on its current location during the reign of Emperor Keikō. This was a period of intense volcanic activity on Mount Fuji, and the shrine was built in order to appease the kami of the mountain. The shrine is mentioned in accounts of the legendary hero Yamato Takeru, who prayed to the kami of Mount Fuji to help him escape from danger while in Suruga. During the reign of Emperor Heizei, Sakanoue no Tamuramaro was ordered to rebuild the shrine in its current location.  

Historical records, however, only exist as far as the early ninth century. The Shoku Nihongi records that Mount Fuji erupted in 781, and the Nihon Montoku Tennō Jitsuroku indicates that the Asama Jinja had become a third-rank shine by 853. As the kami of the shrine is the goddess of fire, it is logical that a shrine was erected to pray for the end of the eruption between 781 and around 806. For this reason, the shrine in Fujinomiya is styled as the "Hongū" and the shrine in Shizuoka is styled as the Shingū. The entire mountain was off-limits for religious reasons, except for Shugendō monks noted for their asceticism. Pilgrimages to Mount Fuji became common in the ninth century onwards, although women were forbidden from climbing. 

During the Kamakura period, the Shōgun Minamoto no Yoritomo was a frequent visitor to the shrine during his hunting expeditions/war games at the base of Mount Fuji, beginning the tradition of yabusame during the shrine's festivals and association with the samurai class. Through the Muromachi period, the Ashikaga clan, Odawara Hōjō, the Imagawa clan, the Takeda clan and the Tokugawa clan were patrons of the shrine. Tokugawa Ieyasu made a large donation after his victory at the Battle of Sekigahara, and subsequent generations of the Tokugawa shogunate kept the shrine in good repair. During the Edo period, the shrine was the center of a cult worshipping Mount Fuji, and drew pilgrims from all over Japan. The Hongū Sengen Taisha was the place at which pilgrims would purify themselves in water before beginning the ascent.

Today, some 400,000 pilgrims climb Mount Fuji every year, and many of them stop at the shrine in order to wish for a safe climb. The shrine celebrated the 1200th anniversary of its foundation in 2006. In 2013, it was included in the World Heritage Site designation for Mount Fuji 

The shrine is located about ten-minutes on foot from Fujinomiya Station on the JR Central Minobu Line.

Cultural properties

Important Cultural Properties
 The Honden of the shrine is in the distinctive sengen-zukuri style with a two-story gate tower. It was built in 1604 per a donation by Tokugawa Ieyasu, but has been repaired several times, most notably after the Ansei Tōkai earthquake of 1854. It has been registered as a National Important Cultural Property since 1907.
 The shrine possesses a Muromachi period hanging scroll depicting the Fuji Mandala (絹本著色富士曼荼羅図 ). The scroll measures 180.2 x 117.8 cm and depicts an idealized view of Mount Fuji in gold, with three summits, each of which contains the image of divinity. A long line of white robed pilgrims is snaking up the slopes of the mountain, and the sun and moon are depicted to either side of the peak. This scroll was designated a National Important Cultural Property in 1977 
The shrine possesses a Kamakura period tachi Japanese sword (太刀 銘南无薬師瑠璃光如来), which is claimed to have been a donation from Takeda Shingen. The hilt of the sword is inscribed with the name "Kanemitsu", who was a noted wordsmith from Bizen active from 1306-1334. This sword was designated a National Important Cultural Property in 1912 
The shrine also possesses a wakizashi dagger (脇指 銘奉富士本宮源式部丞信国) from the Muromachi period. This dagger is inscribed with the date of 1427 on its hilt and the name of "Nobukuni". It was a donation to the shrine by Anayama Nobutomo, the son-in-law of Takeda Nobutora in 1547. It has been registered as a National Important Cultural Property since 1912.

Natural Monument
 
 is a large pond in the shrine grounds which contains a spring which is the headwaters of the Kanda river, a minor tributary of the Fuji River. It has been protected as a National Natural Monument since 1944.

See also
 List of Shinto shrines
 Ichinomiya
 Fujiyoshida, Yamanashi

References

 Plutschow, Herbe. Matsuri: The Festivals of Japan. RoutledgeCurzon (1996) 
 Ponsonby-Fane, Richard Arthur Brabazon. (1962).   Studies in Shinto and Shrines. Kyoto: Ponsonby Memorial Society. OCLC 3994492
 . (1959).  The Imperial House of Japan. Kyoto: Ponsonby Memorial Society. OCLC 194887

External links

Official site of the shrine

Shinto shrines in Shizuoka Prefecture
World Heritage Sites in Japan
Fujinomiya, Shizuoka
Ichinomiya
Suruga Province
Natural monuments of Japan
Kanpei-taisha
Beppyo shrines